Teluk Rubiah is a beach in Manjung District, Perak, Malaysia, 10 km south of Lumut. There is an 18-hole golf course overlooking the coast and beyond.

References

External links
Manjung Community eSpace 

Populated places in Perak